The year 1921 was marked, in science fiction, by the following events.

Births and deaths

Births 

 January 14: Kenneth Bulmer, British writer (died 2005)
 January 25: Russell Braddon, Australian writer (died 1995)
 May 23: James Blish, American writer (died 1975)
 May 31: Arthur Sellings, British writer (died 1968)
 June 6: Francis G. Rayer, British writer (died 1981)
 August 11:  Henri Viard, French writer (died 1989)
 August 19:  Gene Roddenberry, American television screenwriter, producer and creator of the original Star Trek television series (died 1991)
 September 12: Stanisław Lem, polish writer (died 2006)
 October 7: H. H. Hollis, American writer (died 1977)
 November 9: Alfred Coppel, American writer (died 2004)
 Vladimir Colin, writer (died 1991)

Deaths

Events

Awards 
The main science-fiction Awards known at the present time did not exist at this time.

Literary releases

Novels

Stories collections

Short stories 
  L'Homme truqué, by  Maurice Renard

Comics

Audiovisual outputs

Movies

See also 
 1921 in science
 1920 in science fiction
 1922 in science fiction

References

Science fiction by year

science-fiction